Globe Theatre in Regina, Saskatchewan, Canada was founded in 1966 by Ken and Sue Kramer. It was the first professional educational theatre company in Saskatchewan.

Background

Founded in 1966 by Ken and Sue Kramer, Globe Theatre was Saskatchewan's first professional theatre company. It was named for Shakespeare's Globe Theatre in London. Globe Theatre is the province's largest performing arts organization and the regional theatre for Regina. The theatre is housed in the Prince Edward Building in downtown Regina, a designated heritage site that was built in 1906 as the Regina Post Office and RCMP headquarters and later became City Hall. The theatre took over the second and third floors of the building in 1981. In 2014, Globe Theatre purchased The Prince Edward Building.

Globe Theatre programs two stages: a 406-seat theatre-in-the-round stage and a 100-seat black box space where the theatre produces emerging artists and work. The theatre produces six productions per year. The Globe Theatre School was launched in 2006.

Artistic directors
 Ken Kramer (1966–1989)
 Susan Ferley (1989–1998)
 Ruth Smillie (1998–2019)
Jennifer Brewin (2020–present)

See also
 List of Canadian organizations with royal patronage
 Saskatchewan Royal Connections
 Culture in Regina, Saskatchewan

References

External links

 
 Globe Theatre fonds (R3474) at Library and Archives Canada

1966 establishments in Saskatchewan
Culture of Regina, Saskatchewan
Organizations based in Regina, Saskatchewan
Organizations established in 1966
Theatre companies in Saskatchewan
Theatres completed in 1966
Organizations based in Canada with royal patronage
Tourist attractions in Regina, Saskatchewan